Edmund Ross Colhoun (6 May 1821 – 17 February 1897) was a rear admiral of the United States Navy who served during the Mexican War and the American Civil War, in which he was commended for his participation in the bombardment and capture of Fort Fisher.

Naval career

Service from 1839 to 1853
Colhoun was born at Chambersburg, Pennsylvania, on 6 May 1821 and was appointed a midshipman on 1 April 1839. He was attached to the sloop-of-war  in the Brazil Squadron from 1839 to 1841, then to the frigate  in the Mediterranean Squadron and Brazil Squadron from 1842 to 1844. He then attended the Philadelphia Naval School in Philadelphia, Pennsylvania, in 1845 and, after completing his studies, was promoted to passed midshipman on 2 July 1845.

Colhoun next served aboard the frigate  from 1846 to 1847, seeing action in the Mexican War, first under Commodore David Conner in the first attack on Alvarado, Mexico, and then under Commodore Matthew C. Perry at Tabasco, Mexico.

From 1850 to 1851, Colhoun served aboard a receiving ship at Philadelphia, then aboard the frigate  in the Pacific Squadron from 1851 to 1853, being promoted to master on 6 January 1853. He resigned from the Navy on 27 June 1853.

Service from 1861 to 1883
With the onset of the American Civil War in April 1861, Colhoun returned to U.S. Navy service, becoming an acting lieutenant on 24 September 1861. From 1861 to 1862 he was commanding officer first of the steam tugboat , then of the steamer , both operating as part of the Union blockade of the Confederate States of America in the North Atlantic Blockading Squadron. In command of Hunchback, he saw combat at the Battle of Roanoke Island on 7–8 February 1862, the Battle of New Bern on 14 March 1862, and in an engagement on the Blackwater River south of Franklin, Virginia, on 3 October 1862 during the joint expedition against Franklin.

Promoted to commander on 17 November 1862, Colhoun took command of the steamer  in the North Atlantic Blockading Squadron in 1863. Later that year, he became commanding officer of the monitor  in the South Atlantic Blockading Squadron, and led Weehawken in various actions against Confederate forts – among them Fort Sumter, Fort Wagner, and Fort Beauregard – between 10 July and 15 September 1863. He next commanded the monitor  from 1864 to 1865, engaging Howlett's Battery on the James River in Virginia on 21 June and 5 December 1864 and taking her into action in North Carolina in both the First Battle of Fort Fisher in December 1864 and the Second Battle of Fort Fisher in January 1865. He was commended for his participation in the bombardment and capture of Fort Fisher.

After the war, Colhoun had special duty at New York City in 1866 before serving as Fleet Captain of the South Pacific Squadron from 1866 to 1867. He was promoted to captain on 2 March 1869 and was commanding officer of the monitor  from 1869 to 1870. He commanded the sloop-of-war , flagship of the Asiatic Squadron, from 1873 to 1874 and was in command of the entire Asiatic Squadron from 12 January 1874 to 29 May 1874. He then took command of the sloop-of-war , flagship of the South Pacific Squadron, in August 1874.

Leaving Richmond in July 1875, Colhoun was promoted to commodore on 26 April 1876 and took command of Mare Island Navy Yard in Vallejo, California, on 17 April 1877. On 15 January 1881, he relinquished command of the navy yard and was on special duty until 1882 as inspector of vessels in California.  He was promoted to rear admiral on 3 December 1882 and retired from the Navy on 6 May 1883 upon reaching the mandatory retirement age of 62.

Personal life
Colhoun married the former Mary Ann Hays (15 July 1825 – 11 February 1916) in 1845. They had four children. 

Colhoun died suddenly of heart failure in Washington, D.C., late on the evening of 17 February 1897. He is buried with his wife at Arlington National Cemetery in Arlington, Virginia.

Namesakes
Two U.S. Navy destroyers have been named  in Colhoun's honor.

See also

Notes

References
 
 Naval History and Heritage Command: Officers of the Continental and U.S. Navy and Marine Corps, 1775-1900.
 Butler, John P., and Joseph K. Brooks. Edmund Ross Colhoun Papers: A Finding Aid to the Papers in the Naval Historical Foundation Collection in the Library of Congress. Manuscript Division, Library of Congress: Washington, D.C., 2011.
 Anonymous. "Death of Rear Admiral Colhoun." The New York Times. February 18, 1897.
 Anonymous. "Death List of a Day." The New York Times. February 19, 1897. (This source incorrectly gives Colhoun's middle initial as "C.")
 Hamersly, Lewis Randolph. The Records of Living Officers of the U.S. Navy and Marine Corps, Fourth Edition, Philadelphia: L. R. Hamersly & Company, 1890.

External links
 History of Chambersburg, Pennsylvania
 Sketch of Colhoun at Navsource.org
 

1821 births
1897 deaths
Union Navy officers
United States Navy rear admirals (upper half)
People of Pennsylvania in the American Civil War
People from Chambersburg, Pennsylvania
American military personnel of the Mexican–American War
Burials at Arlington National Cemetery